Semen Afanasyevich Zhivago (1807–1863) was a Russian historical painter.

Biography
The son of a merchant from Ryazan, he taught himself how to paint from a young age. In 1826, he presented his work to Grand Duke Michael Pavlovich of Russia, who accepted the young man under her patronage and entered him into the St. Petersburg Academy of Fine Arts. After obtaining two silver medals, Zhivago finished his formation and soon left for his own calculation, into Italy, where he painted copies of famous Italian paintings for a living. For these works, on his return to Saint Petersburg, in 1839, it was acknowledged as an academician.

In 1842, he obtained the title of professor. From 1848 through 1850, he served with the Petersburg custom-house as expert for the painting recognition. In 1860 he moved to Moscow and worked there for the rest of his life. Aside from his historical paintings, Zhivago often painted for cathedrals and palaces and was a prolific portrait painter.

References

Links

Article taken from Russian Wikipedia

1807 births
1863 deaths
19th-century painters from the Russian Empire
Russian male painters
19th-century male artists from the Russian Empire